Jack Duffy (September 4, 1882 – July 23, 1939) was an American film actor. He appeared in more than 80 films between 1916 and 1937, usually looking older than his age with his make-up. He acted in a series of silent shorts for the Christie Film Company, a pioneering movie studio that specialized in producing situational comedies, but also appeared in some Buster Keaton comedies. When his acting career declined in the early 1930s, he continued to work in his dual capacity of make-up artist. Duffy was born in Pawtucket, Rhode Island, and died in Hollywood, California. His sister was actress Kate Price.

Filmography

External links

Jack Duffy at Virtual History

1882 births
1939 deaths
People from Pawtucket, Rhode Island
American male film actors
American male silent film actors
Male actors from Rhode Island
20th-century American male actors